Maireana pyramidata (sago bush, black bluebush, shrubby bluebush) is a species of plant within the genus, Maireana, in the family Amaranthaceae.  It is endemic to Australia, and widespread throughout Australia in the inland, where it is found in Victoria, New South Wales, Queensland, the Northern Territory and Western Australia.

Description
Maireana pyramidata is a low, dense, stiffly branched shrub of a height from 0.3 to 1.5 m, with finely woolly branches. It is both dioecious and unisexual. The leaves are alternate, narrowly cylindrical and covered with a mixture of dendritic (tree-like structure)  and simple hairs.
It fruits from August to November.

Distribution
It is widespread in drier areas, growing on calcareous soils, saline flats, salt lakes, on areas usually prone to flooding.
In Victoria, it is found in the far north-west: Mildura, Red Cliffs, Lake Culluleraine and Kerang-Swan Hill.

In Western Australia, it is found in the IBRA regions of Avon Wheatbelt, Carnarvon, Coolgardie, Gascoyne, Gibson Desert, Great Sandy Desert, Great Victoria Desert, Little Sandy Desert, Murchison, Nullarbor, Pilbara, and Yalgoo.

In New South Wales it is found in the subdivisions: NWP, SWP, NFWP, SFWP.

Taxonomy and naming
It was first described by Bentham in 1870 as Kochia pyramidata, with the type said to have been collected on the Lachlan River by Alan Cunningham in sand hill country. (A syntype is MEL 0044017A.) The species was reassigned to the genus Maireana by Wilson in 1975.

The specific epithet, pyramidata, refers to the pyramidal shape of the centre of the fruit.

References

External links

pyramidata
Flora of Western Australia
Flora of South Australia
Flora of the Northern Territory
Flora of Victoria (Australia)
Flora of Queensland
Dioecious plants